Yashwant Mane is a leader of Nationalist Congress Party who is serving as member of the Maharashtra Legislative Assembly elected from Mohol Assembly constituency.

References

Living people
Year of birth missing (living people)
Maharashtra MLAs 2019–2024
Nationalist Congress Party politicians from Maharashtra
People from Pune